Peniculimius is a grass moth genus (family Crambidae) of subfamily Crambinae; its relationships within the latter group remain obscure. Some authors have placed it in the snout moth family (Pyralidae), where all grass moths were once also included, but this seems to be in error.

Species

References

Diptychophorini
Crambidae genera